Juventud Deportiva Arrate was a handball club based in Eibar, Basque Country. Its last season was 2010–11 in Liga ASOBAL.

History

Club names
From 1990 to 1991: Xerox Arrate
From 1991 to 2011: JD Arrate

Before 2011–12 season, they were expelled from Liga ASOBAL for falling to meet the economic requirement of Liga ASOBAL. Few days after this, Arrate was dissolved by its board members.

Last Squad 2010/11

Statistics 2010/11

Stadium information
Name: - Polideportivo Ipurua
City: - Eibar
Capacity: - 3,500
Address: - C/Santaines Kalea s/n.

Notable former players
 Fernando Fernández Urosa,
 Iñaki Malumbres Aldave
 Alexandru Buligan
 Josemi Marcos Salió 
 Jorge Dueñas 
 Dalibor Čutura
 Gojko Vučinić
 Tin Tokić
 Blaž Vončina
 Bogdan Petričević
 Bojan Beljanski
 Ivan Sever
Haris Kreso
 Alen Geko

Notable former coaches
  Viktor Debre
  Francisco Díaz
  Jordi Ribera Romans
  Željko Martinčević
  Jorge Dueñas

References

External links
JD Arrate Official Website

Basque handball clubs
Handball clubs established in 1947
Sports clubs disestablished in 2011
Defunct handball clubs
1947 establishments in Spain
2011 disestablishments in Spain